Illya Borysovych Zabarnyi (born 1 September 2002) is a Ukrainian professional footballer who plays as a defender for Premier League club Bournemouth and the Ukraine national team.

Club career

Dynamo Kyiv
Zabarnyi is a product of the Dynamo Kyiv youth sportive school from his native city Kyiv. His first trainers were Serhiy Bezhenar and Artem Yashkin.

He played for FC Dynamo Kyiv in the Ukrainian Premier League Reserves and in July 2019 he was promoted to the senior squad team. Zabarnyi made his debut in the Ukrainian Premier League for Dynamo Kyiv only on 11 September 2020, playing in a drawn home match against Desna Chernihiv.

AFC Bournemouth
On 31 January 2023, Zabarnyi signed a 5 and a half year contract with Premier League club Bournemouth.

International career
In 2020 Zabarnyi was called up for the Ukraine U21's matches in September 2020 and made the debut in a match against Finland U21.

He made his national team debut on 7 October 2020 in a friendly against France.

Career statistics

Club

International

Honours
Dynamo Kyiv
Ukrainian Premier League: 2020–21
Ukrainian Cup: 2020–21
Ukrainian Super Cup: 2020
Individual
 Golden talent of Ukraine (Under-19): 2020, 2021

References

External links 
Profile at the AFC Bournemouth website

2002 births
Living people
Footballers from Kyiv
Ukrainian footballers
FC Dynamo Kyiv players
AFC Bournemouth players
Ukrainian Premier League players
Premier League players
Association football defenders
Ukraine youth international footballers
Ukraine under-21 international footballers
Ukraine international footballers
Ukrainian expatriate footballers
Expatriate footballers in England
Ukrainian expatriate sportspeople in England
UEFA Euro 2020 players